David Russell Duerson (November 28, 1960February 17, 2011) was an American professional football player who was a safety in the National Football League (NFL) for 11 seasons, primarily with the Chicago Bears. As a member of the Bears, he was selected to four consecutive Pro Bowls from 1985 to 1988 and was part of the 1985 defense that won the franchise's first Super Bowl in Super Bowl XX. He also played for the New York Giants and Arizona Cardinals, winning Super Bowl XXV with the former.

At age 50, Duerson died of a self-inflicted gunshot wound to the chest. Following his request, his brain was sent to the Boston University School of Medicine for research on chronic traumatic encephalopathy (CTE). Neurologists at Boston University confirmed that Duerson had CTE as a result of the concussions he had during his playing career.

Early life
Born and raised in Muncie, Indiana, Duerson played football, basketball, and baseball at Northside High School. Duerson's honors during his high school years included the 1979 Indiana Mr. Football.

College career
Duerson played college football at the University of Notre Dame from 1979 to 1982, and graduated with honors, with a BA in economics.  He started all four years for the Fighting Irish, and earned recognition as an All-American in 1981 and 1982. Duerson was a captain and the team's MVP as a senior in 1982, intercepting seven passes and returning them for 104 yards.  He finished his college career with 12 interceptions, which he returned for 256 yards and a touchdown.  He also returned 103 punts for 869 yards and 3 kickoffs for 75.

He was the winner of the Edward "Moose" Krause Distinguished Service Award in 1990 by the Notre Dame Monogram Club, of which he was a past president. He was also a member of the University of Notre Dame Board of Trustees from 2001 to 2005.

Professional career
Taken in the third round of the 1983 NFL Draft by the Chicago Bears, Duerson was selected to four consecutive Pro Bowls (–). He won two Super Bowl championship rings, with the 1985 Bears (XX), and 1990 Giants (XXV). During the 1986 season, Duerson set an NFL record that stood for 19 years (Adrian Wilson, 2005) for most sacks in a season by a defensive back, with seven. He also intercepted six passes for 139 yards with a longest return of 38 yards. At season's end, Duerson was named first-team All-Pro by Pro Football Weekly, the Pro Football Writers Association and The Sporting News and second-team All-Pro by the Associated Press.  In 1987, Duerson was the recipient of the NFL Man of the Year Award. In his 11 seasons, Duerson recorded 20 interceptions, which he returned for 226 yards, and 16 quarterback sacks. He also recovered five fumbles, returning them for 47 yards and a touchdown.

After football
Duerson owned three McDonald's restaurants in Louisville, Kentucky for six months, from late 1994 to April 1995. He purchased the majority interest in Fair Oaks Farms (formerly Brooks Sausage Company) in 1995. He sold his stake in the company in 2002 and started Duerson Foods, but that company was forced into receivership in 2006 and most of its assets were auctioned off.

Death
Duerson was found dead at his Sunny Isles Beach, Florida home on February 17, 2011. The Miami-Dade County medical examiner reported that Duerson died of a self-inflicted gunshot wound to the chest. He sent a text message to his family saying he wanted his brain to be used for research at the Boston University School of Medicine, which is conducting research into chronic traumatic encephalopathy (CTE), a neurodegenerative disease, which can be caused by playing football. He left behind three sons and a daughter from his marriage to ex-wife Alicia. He was buried in the Cedar Grove Cemetery in Notre Dame, Indiana.

On May 2, 2011, neurologists at Boston University confirmed that he had had CTE, which is linked to concussions.

In popular media
Duerson was portrayed by actor Adewale Akinnuoye-Agbaje in the 2015 film Concussion. Duerson's family was displeased with how he was portrayed. Duerson was also mentioned in the HBO series Ballers in reference to CTE with character Ricky Jerret.

See also

List of suicides

References

External links

1960 births
2011 deaths
2011 suicides
African-American players of American football
American football players with chronic traumatic encephalopathy
American football safeties
Burials in Indiana
Chicago Bears players
Deaths by firearm in Florida
Harvard Business School alumni
National Conference Pro Bowl players
New York Giants players
Notre Dame Fighting Irish football players
Phoenix Cardinals players
Players of American football from Indiana
Sportspeople from Muncie, Indiana
Suicides by firearm in Florida